Kintore in Aberdeenshire was a royal burgh that returned one commissioner to the Parliament of Scotland and to the Convention of Estates.

The Parliament of Scotland ceased to exist with the Act of Union 1707, and the commissioner for Kintore, Sir George Allardice, was one of those co-opted to represent Scotland in the first Parliament of Great Britain. From the 1708 general election Banff, Cullen, Elgin, Inverurie and Kintore comprised the Elgin district of burghs, electing one Member of Parliament between them.

List of burgh commissioners
 1579: Mr Thomas Mollison
 1617: Walter Cheyne
 1621: John Leslie
 1661–63: Mr James Keith
 1667 (convention), 1669–74: Mr William Moir 
 1678 (convention): Adam Pittendreich
 1681, 1685–86: John Udny of Newtyle and Cultercullen
 1689 (convention), 1690: Hugh Wallace of Ingliston (declared ineligible 1693)
 1693–1702: Sir James Scougall of Whitehill
 1703–07: Sir George Allardice

See also
 List of constituencies in the Parliament of Scotland at the time of the Union

References
 Margaret D. Young, The Parliaments of Scotland: Burgh and Shire Commissioners, volume 2, 1993. Appendix 2, page 780.

Burghs represented in the Parliament of Scotland (to 1707)
Constituencies disestablished in 1707
History of Aberdeenshire
Politics of the county of Aberdeen
1707 disestablishments in Scotland